Samuel Johnson (born September 7, 1964) is a former American football wide receiver who played one season with the Los Angeles Rams of the National Football League. He first enrolled at Los Angeles Southwest College before transferring to Prairie View A&M University. He attended South Gate High School in South Gate, California.

References

External links
Just Sports Stats

Living people
1964 births
American football wide receivers
Prairie View A&M Panthers football players
Los Angeles Rams players
Players of American football from Los Angeles
People from East Los Angeles, California
National Football League replacement players